Cindy Gnadinger is an American educator and academic administrator, currently serving as the 15th President of Carroll University in Waukesha, Wisconsin.

Early life and education 
A native of Shepherdsville, Kentucky, Gnadinger earned a Bachelor of Science from Western Kentucky University and a Master of Education and Doctor of Education from the University of Louisville. Gnadinger was the recipient of a Fulbright Scholarship in 2013, allowing her to study in France.

Career 
Gnadinger began her career as a faculty member of the University of Louisville from 1994 to 2000. She then served at Bellarmine University from 2000 to 2013, working as an Associate Professor, Director of Graduate Education Programs, Dean of the School of Education, and Assistant Vice President for Academic Affairs. She then moved to William Peace University, where she was a professor of education and Vice President for Academic Affairs. Gnadinger served as President of St. Catharine College until the school shut down in 2016. Gnadinger became the 15th President of Carroll University on July 1, 2017, succeeding Doug Hastad.

Personal life 
Gnadinger's husband, John, was appointed director of Carroll University’s Analytics and Business Intelligence Consortium after leaving a career at Johnson Controls. They have three sons.

References 

Living people
Western Kentucky University alumni
University of Louisville alumni
People from Shepherdsville, Kentucky
Carroll University faculty
Bellarmine University faculty
University of Louisville faculty
William Peace University
Year of birth missing (living people)